Eddie Schenk (12 March 1903 – 7 July 1974) was an Australian rules footballer who played with Fitzroy in the Victorian Football League (VFL).

Schenk later served in the Royal Australian Air Force during World War II.

External links

Notes 

1903 births
1974 deaths
Australian rules footballers from Victoria (Australia)
Fitzroy Football Club players